Alastair Humphreys is an English adventurer, author and motivational speaker. Over a four-year period he bicycled  around the world. He was a National Geographic Adventurer of the Year in 2012. He is responsible for the rise of the idea of the microadventure – short, local, accessible adventures.

Biography
Humphreys studied at the University of Edinburgh and Oxford. He began his first expedition in August 2001 from his Yorkshire home. Passing south through Europe and Africa, he crossed to South America by sea from Cape Town and proceeded up the west coast of the Americas, crossed from Alaska to Magadan in Russia, Japan then westward across China and Central Asia to return to Europe. His journey included raising funds and awareness for a charity called Hope and Homes for Children.

He has written several books about his experiences, titled Moods of Future Joys, Ten Lessons from the Road, Thunder and Sunshine and a series of three children's books called The Boy Who Biked the World. Humphreys also wrote a book about walking across India called There Are Other Rivers.

Humphreys currently works as a motivational speaker and author. The President of the Royal Geographical Society said, "With the possible exception of Sir David Attenborough, that was the best lecture, and the longest applause that I have heard in the past 15 years."

In 2008, Humphreys competed in the Marathon des Sables, a  run across the Sahara desert. He broke his foot during the race but still completed the event. He narrowly missed being in the top-100 finishers.

In February 2009, Humphreys rowed across the English Channel with Major Phil Packer to raise £1 million for Help for Heroes. In spring 2009, Humphreys walked across India, and in 2010 he walked and packrafted across Iceland.

His 2011 "Year of Microadventure" earned him the National Geographic accolade of "Adventurer of the Year". Humphreys pioneered the concept and coined the term "microadventure" which has since gained him a global following. "#microadventure" is now used as a popular hashtag on social media sites.

In 2012 he joined Marin Medak, Simon Osborne and Steve Bowens to row unsupported across the Atlantic Ocean. The team successfully finished their journey in Barbados after 45 days and 15 hours at sea. He also walked across the Empty Quarter desert with Leon McCarron and undertook an expedition in Greenland.

In 2013, Humphreys released his first documentary film, Into the Empty Quarter, documenting his walk through the Empty Quarter desert with Leon McCarron The film premiered at the Royal Geographical Society, London, in November 2013. In 2020, Humphreys appeared on the podcast Trees A Crowd.

Publications
 Alastair Humphreys, 2007. Moods of Future Joys: Around the World by Bike – Part 1. Eye Books. .
 Alastair Humphreys, 2007. Thunder and Sunshine: Around the World by Bike – Part 2. Eye Books. 
 Alastair Humphreys, 2009. Ten Lessons from the Road. Eye Books. 
 Alastair Humphreys, 2011. The Boy Who Biked the World: On the Road to Africa. Eye Books.
 Alastair Humphreys, 2011. The Boy Who Biked the World: Part Two: Riding the Americas. Eye Books.
 Alastair Humphreys, 2011. The Boy Who Biked the World: Part Three: Riding Home Through Asia. Eye Books.
 Alastair Humphreys, 2011. There Are Other Rivers: On Foot Across India. Self Published.
 Alastair Humphreys, 2014. Microadventures. HarperCollins.
 Alastair Humphreys, 2016. Grand Adventures. HarperCollins.
 Alastair Humphreys, 2018. Alastair Humphreys' Great Adventurers. Big Picture Press.
 Alastair Humphreys, 2019. Around the World by Bike. Blink Publishing. (an audiobook compilation of Moods of Future Joys and Thunder and Sunshine)
 Alastair Humphreys, 2019. My Midsummer Morning: Rediscovering a Life of Adventure. HarperCollins.
 Alastair Humphreys, 2019. The Doorstep Mile: Live More Adventurously Every Day. Self Published.
 Alastair Humphreys, 2020. A Notebook for Adventures: The Doorstep Mile. Self Published.
 Alastair Humphreys, 2020. A Notebook for Living Adventurously: Questions and Answers. Self Published.
 Alastair Humphreys, 2021. Ask an Adventurer. Eye Books.

See also
 Bicycle touring

References

External links
 Alastair Humphreys' Homepage

Living people
English male cyclists
English explorers
British bloggers
English travel writers
Male touring cyclists
Ultra-distance cyclists
Cycling writers
English non-fiction writers
English motivational speakers
Place of birth missing (living people)
English male non-fiction writers
Male bloggers
Year of birth missing (living people)